Deirdre Costello is a former camogie player, winner of an All Ireland senior medal when Galway won its first senior championship in 1996, and winner of the AIB Gaelic Star award for Camogie Junior Player of the year in 1985.

Award year
She won three All Ireland medals at different grades in 1985, scoring four goals for Galway in the All Ireland Junior final against Armagh in September, scoring 3–5 for St Raphael’s Loughrea whom she captained to victory against Loreto, in the All Ireland colleges final in March, and winning a National Junior League medal with Galway in May. She finished second in the Gradam Taillte skills competition and scored 2–1 in the All Ireland minor final against Cork, in which Galway were defeated. She played for Connacht in both the junior and senior finals of the Gael Linn Cup that year, scoring a goal in the senior final.

Career
She scored 3-3 for St Raphael’s Loughrea in the All Ireland colleges final of 1986.

References

External links
 Camogie.ie Official Camogie Association Website
 Wikipedia List of Camogie players

Year of birth missing (living people)
Living people
Galway camogie players